La dama boba (given various titles in English including The Lady Simpleton, The Lady Boba: a Woman of Little Sense, ''Lady Nitwit, The Lady-Fool) is a 1613 comedy by the Spanish playwright Lope de Vega. It is one of the earliest examples of the "comedia palatina" subgenre. De Vega completed it on 28 April 1613, as shown by a surviving manuscript copy in his own hand.

Translations
The Lady Simpleton Max Oppenheimer, Jr. Lawrence, KS: Coronado 1976
Lady Nitwit trans. William I. Oliver Editorial Bilingüe, 1998
Wit's end: an adaptation of Lope de Vega's La dama boba Edward H. Friedman 2000
The Lady Boba: a Woman of Little Sense David Johnston 2013

Adaptations
1939 - La dama boba (opera). Ermanno Wolf-Ferrari set the play as an opera in 1939. 
1969 - La dama boba  Estudio 1
1980 - La dama boba  Estudio 1
2006 - La dama boba (film)

References 

 Alejandro Gadea Raga y Mimma de Salvo, "Jerónima de Burgos y Pedro de Valdés: biografía de un matrimonio de representantes en la España del Seiscientos", Diablotexto: Revista de critica literaria, no. 4–5, 1997–1998, pp. 143–176. .
 Mimma de Salvo, "Sobre el reparto de La dama boba de Lope de Vega", Voz y letra: Revista de literatura, vol. 11, no. 1, 2000, pp. 69–91. .
 Mimma de Salvo, "Notas sobre Lope de Vega y Jerónima de Burgos: un estado de la cuestión", en Rafael Beltrán Llavador (coord.), Homenaje a Luis Quirante, vol. 1, 2003, pp. 141–156. (Estudios teatrales). .

1613 plays
Comedy plays
Plays by Lope de Vega